Sergio Raimondi (1968, Bahía Blanca) is an Argentine poet.
He is also a professor at Universidad Nacional del Sur, where he is in charge of the subject Contemporary Literature (I & II). Until June, 2011, he was the director of the Museo del Puerto de Ingeniero White.

Awards
2007 Guggenheim Fellowship

Works
"Limón solo"; "se queman los ojos pero no se ven astros"; "el tema"; "Egipto", La Corota, January 19, 2005
Catulito Vox, 1999 (translations of [Catullus]'s poetry)
Poesía civil Bahia Blanca: Vox, 2001
Zivilpoesie, Berlin, Wissenschaftlicher Verlag Berlin, 2005, 
Für ein kommentiertes Wörterbuch, Berlin, Berenberg Verlag, 2012,

Anthologies
"Di fronte a un esplanare di Defense of Poetry"; "Il poeta minore alla nascito del figlio"; "Pittori della domenica a Puerto Piojo", Smerialliana. Semestrale di civilta poetiche, Volumes 7-8, Lìbrati Editrice, 2007,

References

21st-century Argentine poets
21st-century Argentine male writers
Argentine male poets
1968 births
Living people
Academic staff of Universidad Nacional del Sur
People from Bahía Blanca